This is a list of diplomatic missions of Iraq. Iraq maintains a network of diplomatic missions abroad. While the country has re-opened its missions in Washington, London, Tehran and the capitals of other states it was previously hostile to, Iraq does not have diplomatic relations with Israel.

Africa 

 Algiers (Embassy)

 Cairo (Embassy)

 Nairobi (Embassy)

 Tripoli (Embassy)

 Nouakchott (Embassy)

 Rabat (Embassy)

 Abuja (Embassy)  

 Dakar (Embassy)

 Pretoria (Embassy)

 Khartoum (Embassy)

 Tunis (Embassy)

Americas 

 Brasília (Embassy)

 Ottawa (Embassy)
 Montreal (Consulate-General) 
 Toronto (Consulate-General)

 Mexico City (Embassy) 

 Washington, D.C. (Embassy)
 Detroit (Consulate-General)
 Los Angeles (Consulate-General)

 Caracas (Embassy)

Asia 

 Yerevan (Embassy)

 Baku (Embassy)

 Manama (Embassy)

 Dhaka (Embassy)  

 Beijing (Embassy)

 Tbilisi (Embassy)

 New Delhi (Embassy)

 Jakarta (Embassy)

 Tehran (Embassy)
 Ahvaz (Consulate-General)
 Kermanshah (Consulate-General)
 Mashhad (Consulate-General)

 Tokyo (Embassy)

 Amman (Embassy)

 Astana (Embassy)

 Kuwait City (Embassy)

 Beirut (Embassy)

 Kuala Lumpur (Embassy)

 Muscat (Embassy)

 Islamabad (Embassy)

 Manila (Embassy)  

 Doha (Embassy)

 Riyadh (Embassy)
 Jeddah (Consulate-General) 

 Seoul (Embassy) 

 Colombo (Embassy)  

 Damascus (Embassy)
 Aleppo (Consulate-General)

 Ankara (Embassy)
 Gaziantep (Consulate-General)
 Istanbul (Consulate-General)

 Abu Dhabi (Embassy)
 Dubai (Consulate-General)

 Sana'a (Embassy)

Europe 

 Vienna (Embassy)

 Brussels (Embassy)

 Sofia (Embassy)

 Zagreb (Embassy)

 Prague (Embassy)

 Copenhagen (Embassy)

 Helsinki (Embassy)

 Paris (Embassy)

 Berlin (Embassy)
 Frankfurt (Consulate General)

 Athens (Embassy)

 Rome (Embassy)

 Budapest (Embassy)

 Rome (Embassy)

 The Hague (Embassy)

 Oslo (Embassy)

 Warsaw (Embassy)

 Lisbon (Embassy)

 Bucharest (Embassy)

 Moscow (Embassy)

 Belgrade (Embassy)

 Madrid (Embassy)

 Stockholm (Embassy)

 Bern (Embassy)

 Kyiv (Embassy)  

 London (Embassy)
 Manchester (Consulate-General)

Oceania 

 Canberra (Embassy)
 Sydney (Consulate-General)

Multilateral organizations 
 Cairo (Permanent Representation to Arab League)
 Geneva (Permanent Mission to the United Nations and other international organisations)
 New York (Permanent Mission to the United Nations)
 Paris (Permanent Mission to United Nations Educational, Scientific and Cultural Organisation)

Gallery

Non-resident embassies 

  (Brasilia)
  (Athens)
  (Pretoria)
  (Caracas)
  (Washington, D.C.)
  (Caracas)
  (Moscow)
  (Mexico City)
  (Abuja)
  (Lima)
  (Budapest)
  (Pretoria)
  (Dakar)
  (Nairobi)
  (Abuja)
  (Dakar)
  (Abuja)
  (Brasilia)
  (Beijing)
  (Khartoum)
  (Nairobi)
  (Canberra)
  (Caracas)
  (Abuja)
  (Abuja)
  (Mexico City)
  (Washington, D.C.)
  (Mexico City)
  (Abuja)
  (Helsinki)
  (Caracas)
  (Pretoria)
  (Abuja)
  (Dakar)
  (Caracas)
  (Mexico City)
  (Brasilia)
  (Dakar)
  (Dakar)
  (Washington, D.C.)
  (Mexico City)
  (Oslo)
  (Abuja)
  (London)
  (Washington, D.C.)
  (Manila)
  (Nur-Sultan)
  (Beijing)
  (Stockholm)
  (Pretoria)
  (Abuja)
  (Copenhagen)
  (Manila)
  (Manila)
  (Pretoria)
  (New Delhi)
  (Dakar)
  (Pretoria)
  (Pretoria)
  (Paris)
  (Beijing)
  (Belgrade)
  (Jakarta)
  (Beijing)
  (Canberra)
  (New Delhi)
  (Paris)
  (Canberra)
  (Mexico City)
  (Abuja)
  (Canberra)
  (Sofia)
  (Amman)
  (Brasilia)
  (Canberra)
  (Buenos Aires)
  (Dar es Salaam)
  (Rome)
  (Wellington)
  (Canberra)
  (Abuja)
  (Caracas)
  (Caracas)
  (Caracas)
  (Nairobi) 
  (Dakar)
  (Jakarta)
  (Vienna)
  (Khartoum)
  (Nairobi)
  (Kuala Lumpur)
  (Kabul)
  (Tehran) 
  (Abuja)
  (Canberra)
  (Caracas)
  (Jakarta)
  (Canberra)
  (Nairobi)
  (Brasilia)
  (Canberra)
 (Beijing)
  (Pretoria)
  (Pretoria)

See also 
 Foreign relations of Iraq

Notes

References 

Ministry of Foreign Affairs of the Republic of Iraq
Iraq - Embassies and Consulates

 
Iraq
Diplomatic missions